Book Of Ezekiel is the debut solo studio album by American rapper Freekey Zekey of The Diplomats. It was released on July 24, 2007 via Diplomat Records, Asylum Records, Koch Records and Atlantic Records, and features guest appearances from Juelz Santana, Cam'ron, Jim Jones, Hell Rell, J.R. Writer, Sen, Tobb and Ash.

Track listing

Chart history

References

External links
Freekey Zekey – Book Of Ezekiel at Discogs
The Book of Ezekiel by Freekey Zekey on iTunes

2007 debut albums
Freekey Zekey albums
Diplomat Records albums